Relaxer (stylised as RELAXER) is the third studio album by English indie rock band alt-J, released on 2 June 2017 by Infectious Music and the Canvasback Music division of Atlantic Records. It was originally scheduled to be released on 9 June 2017 but the band later decided to release it a week earlier.

The band recorded Relaxer in London with producer Charlie Andrew, who also produced alt-J's first two albums. It includes songs composed entirely during the album's recording and songs dating back to the band's formative years at the University of Leeds. Six of the album's eight tracks feature strings arranged by alt-J and performed by the London Metropolitan Orchestra. "House of the Rising Sun" is a rearrangement of the traditional folk tune with additional verses from the band. "3WW" and "Deadcrush" feature guest vocals from Ellie Rowsell of Wolf Alice and "Last Year" features guest vocals from Marika Hackman, who sang on alt-J's previous album.

alt-J promoted Relaxer with the singles "3WW", "In Cold Blood", "Adeline", "Deadcrush" and "Pleader", with music videos for all except "Adeline". The band also enlisted Japanese artist Osamu Sato to create a playable online game inspired by his own game LSD: Dream Emulator as part of the promotion for Relaxer. The album's artwork features a screenshot from Sato's game. The band embarked on the Relaxer Tour on 10 June 2017 with performances at festivals including Glastonbury and Lollapalooza. The album was nominated for the 2017 Mercury Prize. A remix album of tracks from Relaxer titled Reduxer was released on 28 September 2018.

Background and recording

In 2014, alt-J released their second studio album This Is All Yours to commercial success, going straight to Number 1 on the UK Albums Chart. The band began touring in September 2014, performing for the first time since the departure of group member Gwil Sainsbury. They toured to the end of 2015, headlining their largest US show at Madison Square Garden. The band's popularity grew further when their songs were featured in films, television shows and commercials. The album was nominated for Best Alternative Music Album at the 57th Grammy Awards.

In December 2015, alt-J finished performing the final shows of their tour in support of This Is All Yours. The band returned to London, taking their first break from writing and touring since the recording of their debut album An Awesome Wave in 2011. Drummer Thom Sonny Green released his solo debut album High Anxiety on 19 August 2016; keyboardist Gus Unger-Hamilton started Dandy Café, a pop-up restaurant in London Fields; and lead vocalist Joe Newman took time off, during which he watched films.

The band reconvened in a writing studio in North London to "take the bubble wrap off" their ideas for new material and eventually began recording for the album in August 2016.

In November 2016, alt-J traveled to Ely, a cathedral city in Cambridgeshire, to conduct field recordings of its organ and its boys' choir, which Unger-Hamilton was a member of during his youth. They also recorded burning sounds from the cathedral's cast iron heaters and the sounds of visitors walking its floors.

The band recorded string sections for "3WW" and "Adeline" and brass sections for "In Cold Blood" in Studio Two of London's famed Abbey Road Studios in Westminster, which they revealed on Instagram in January 2017.

Music and lyrics

"In Cold Blood" features "interweaving vocals" underpinned by the "flashes" of a brass section and the "bleeping electronics" of a Casiotone purchased by the band for £1.05 on eBay.

"House of the Rising Sun" is a rearrangement of the traditional folk tune with additional verses from the band. It begins on the traditional chorus and first verse of Woody Guthrie's version, with minor differences. The second verse is original and was written by Joe Newman. The song is also structured around a separate original chorus written by the band. Unger-Hamilton described the song as an "original piece of work and not just chucking in a cover to fill space as it were." It features twenty classical guitarists playing at once, which Unger-Hamilton likened to the work of John Cage: "you're not just hearing the guitar riffs, you're hearing the sound of the room, you're hearing 20 different people's fingers creaking on the neck. And you're listening to everything, and that's what you get from doing it properly and not just layering up one person 20 times."

"Hit Me Like That Snare" is a "garage-rock" jam inspired by "Decks Dark" by Radiohead. The song is about a person who goes to experience a sex hotel and wanders from room to room. It contains the lyric "We're going down, fuck my life in half", which is taken from when Joe Newman was driving to London from Southampton with his girlfriend when his car hit a large puddle and he screamed, "Fuck my life in half."

The Guardian likened the music of "Deadcrush" to that of Nine Inch Nails, whereas PopMatters compared it to that of Depeche Mode.

"Last Year" is a gentle "acoustic lullaby", closing on a bassoon solo. In the first half, Joe Newman sings from the point of view of a man experiencing a decline in his mental health in 2016. It is sung chronologically, with Newman listing each month followed by the man's reflection. The second half of the song introduces Marika Hackman singing as the man's ex-girlfriend, who broke up with him in January and is now singing at his funeral in December.

"Pleader" is a "theatrical crescendo" that prominently features orchestral strings and Spanish guitar. Its lyrics are based on the plot of Richard Llewellyn's book How Green Was My Valley, about a small mining community in nineteenth-century Wales. The book's title is repeated in the song's refrain. It is structured as a hymn and features the boys' choir and the organ of Ely Cathedral, which were added to give a "church feeling" to the song. Unger-Hamilton described it as a "pastoral celebration of a time that's no longer, a time that's gone."

The title Relaxer was originally the name of song made by drummer Thom Sonny Green and was then originally in the lyrics for "Deadcrush". Green felt that the name seemed to fit the album overall, stating, "We do always want our albums to be listened to as a single piece of music."

Promotion and release
On 3 March 2017, alt-J uploaded a one-minute video to social media containing new music and what was reported to be footage from the 1998 video game LSD. The video was tagged with the title "00110011 01110111 01110111", which is binary code for "3ww". On 6 March 2017, Relaxer was announced with a 9 June 2017 release date and its first single "3WW" was released with an accompanying visualizer video similar to LSD. On 29 March 2017, alt-J premiered "In Cold Blood" on MistaJam's BBC Radio 1 show as his 'Hottest Record in the World'. It was released the same day with an accompanying visualizer video as the album's second single. The band also announced that they decided to release the album a week earlier on 2 June 2017. "Adeline" was released on 24 May 2017 with an accompanying visualizer video as Relaxers third single. On 12 July 2017, "Deadcrush" was released as the fourth single from the album, with a music video. On 15 September 2017, an edit of "Pleader" was released as the fifth and final single. A music video for "Pleader" was released on 15 November 2017.

A music video for "3WW" was released on 13 April 2017. An Iggy Pop-narrated music video for "In Cold Blood" was released on 9 May 2017. alt-J partnered with director Alex Takacs for a second time for the music video for "Deadcrush" and released it on 12 July 2017.

On 19 May 2017, alt-J performed "3WW" and "In Cold Blood" on the sixth episode of the fiftieth series of Later... with Jools Holland, accompanied by Ellie Rowsell on "3WW". On 18 April 2017, alt-J performed "In Cold Blood" on the 656th episode of The Tonight Show Starring Jimmy Fallon. The band performed the song with a backing horn section and with Questlove, the drummer of Jimmy Fallon's house band The Roots. On 5 June 2017, alt-J performed "In Cold Blood" on Conan.

Tour

A world tour in support of Relaxer began on 10 June 2017 in Rouen, France. The tour features several performances at music festivals, including Glastonbury, the Montreux Jazz Festival and Lollapalooza. It includes dates in Australia, New Zealand, Japan, Indonesia and all across Europe and North America.

On 11 December 2017, alt-j released 2017 Live EP. Released as a free digital download on Canvasback Music's website, the EP collects live recordings of "Deadcrush", "Hit Me Like That Snare", "Dissolve Me", "Every Other Freckle" and "Pleader" performed by the band during the North American leg of the Relaxer Tour.

Artwork
Artwork for Relaxer's cover and promotional material was taken from the 1998 PlayStation video game LSD: Dream Emulator by Japanese artist Osamu Sato.

Critical reception

At Metacritic, which assigns a normalised rating out of 100 to reviews from mainstream publications, Relaxer received an average score of 65, based on 27 reviews. In The Daily Telegraph, chief critic Neil McCormick found it "deeply gorgeous and utterly baffling", labelling it "internet era pop" with its "barrier-free absorption of so many different musical styles a product of the computer recording technology it is created with." Lisa Wright of DIY praised the album, stating alt-J have "crafted possibly the most strangely original niche in modern music." Kyle Mullin of Under the Radar praised the album's diversity: "This all-over-the-map approach makes Relaxer a bit dizzying and tough to digest at first, and yet you'll be immediately captivated and intrigued by its distinctive mix. And once you give it a few more listens, many of its varied songs will worm their way into your ears as some of this summer's best indie rock offerings."

In a negative review, Jayson Greene of Pitchfork said, "The truth is that alt-J have never had an identity, really, apart from Newman's mangled lyrics and the fidgety, distracted arrangements of their songs. RELAXER shows us what remains after those quirks are dialed back: some perfectly nice, perfectly blank lads who have no idea why they are standing in front of you and even less of an idea what to say."

Accolades
Relaxer was shortlisted for the 2017 Mercury Prize. The band previously won the prize in 2012 for their debut album An Awesome Wave.

Track listing

Notes
"3WW" features vocals by Ellie Rowsell
"Deadcrush" features vocals by Ellie Rowsell
"Last Year" features vocals by Marika Hackman

Sample credits
"House of the Rising Sun" is a rearrangement of the traditional folk tune "The House of the Rising Sun", with an additional verse written by the band themselves
"Adeline" adapts a melody from Hans Zimmer's score of The Thin Red Line

Personnel
Credits adapted from Tidal, AllMusic and Discogs

alt-J
Joe Newman – bass, guitar, vocals
Thom Sonny Green – drums, percussion, programming
Gus Unger-Hamilton – keyboards, vocals

Additional musicians
Ellie Rowsell – vocals 
Marika Hackman – vocals 
Jon Whitten – yangqin
Hinako Omori – background vocals 
Ely Cathedral Boy Choristers – choir 
London Metropolitan Orchestra – strings 
Joe Auckland – trumpet 
Adrian Hallowell – trombone 
Mike Kearsey – trombone 
Trevor Mires – trombone 
Martin Williams – tenor saxophone

Technical
Charlie Andrew – production, mixing, engineering, programming
Brett Cox – engineering
Jay Pocknell - engineering
Stefano Civetta – assistant engineering
Paul Pritchard – assistant engineering
Graeme Baldwin – assistant engineering
Dick Beetham – mastering

Artwork and design
Osamu Sato

Charts

Weekly charts

Year-end charts

Certifications

Release history

References

2017 albums
Alt-J albums
Albums produced by Charlie Andrew
Atlantic Records albums
Infectious Music albums